Leyla Sarah McCalla (born October 3, 1985) is an American classical and folk musician. She was a cellist with the Grammy-winning string band Carolina Chocolate Drops but left to focus on her solo career.

Background
Both of McCalla's parents were born in Haiti. Her father Jocelyn McCalla was the Executive Director of the New York-based National Coalition for Haitian Rights from 1988 to 2006 and is credited as translator on her album Vari-Colored Songs.  Her mother Régine Dupuy arrived in the United States at age 5, and is the daughter of Ben Dupuy who ran Haïti Progrès, a New York-based Haitian socialist newspaper. McCalla's mother went on to found Dwa Fanm, an anti-domestic violence human rights organization.  McCalla's younger sister, Sabine McCalla, is also a musician in New Orleans.

McCalla was born in Queens, New York City, and raised in Maplewood, New Jersey, where she attended Columbia High School. She lived in Accra, Ghana for two years as a teen. After a year at Smith College, she transferred to New York University to study cello performance and chamber music. In 2010 she then moved to New Orleans where she honed her craft playing music on the streets of the French Quarter. In addition to cello, she also plays banjo and guitar.

Career
From 2011 to 2013, McCalla was a member of the Carolina Chocolate Drops.  As of 2019 she is a member of Our Native Daughters.

As of 2017, McCalla was touring with her New Orleans-based trio, which also included her Québécois husband Daniel Tremblay on guitar, banjo, and iron triangle (ti fer); and Free Feral on vocals and guitar.

In 2019-20, McCalla toured with her Leyla McCalla Quartet, which included New Orleans musicians Dave Hammer (electric guitar), Shawn Myers (drums/percussion), and Pete Olynciw (electric and acoustic bass).

First album
McCalla's critically acclaimed album Vari-Colored Songs is a tribute to Langston Hughes which includes adaptations of his poems, Haitian folk songs sung in Haitian Creole, and original compositions. McCalla says the first song she wrote for the album was "Heart of Gold" because it provided "a window into Hughes' thinking". McCalla chose to dedicate this work to Hughes because she says "reading his work made me want to be an artist." McCalla started working on the album 5 years prior to its release. Commentators have noted the influence of Louisiana musical traditions such as old Cajun fiddle melodies and trad-jazz banjo on the album. Members of the Carolina Chocolate Drops appear on the album. The album was financed at least in part through a crowdfunding campaign on Kickstarter which exceeded its goal of $5,000 to raise $20,000.

Personal life
As of 2019, McCalla is married to fellow musician, and electrician, Daniel Tremblay.  They live in the New Orleans area and have three children.

Discography
 Vari-Colored Songs: A Tribute to Langston Hughes (February 4, 2014, Music Maker)
 A Day for the Hunter, A Day for the Prey (May 20, 2016, Jazz Village/Harmonia Mundi)
 Capitalist Blues (January 25, 2019, Jazz Village/PIAS)
 Breaking The Thermometer (May 6, 2022, ANTI-)

Collaborations
 Carolina Chocolate Drops: Leaving Eden (February 24, 2012, Nonesuch)
 Our Native Daughters: Songs of Our Native Daughters (February 22, 2019, Smithsonian Folkways)

External links

References

Living people
1985 births
Columbia High School (New Jersey) alumni
People from Maplewood, New Jersey
Musicians from New York City
Musicians from New Orleans
American musicians of Haitian descent
American cellists
American folk musicians
Women cellists
Singers from Louisiana
21st-century American women musicians
The Carolina Chocolate Drops members
African-American women musicians
21st-century African-American women singers
21st-century cellists